Clyde Acle Swendsen (May 25, 1895 – December 1, 1979) was an American diver, water polo player and coach. He won the AAU titles in the 10 m platform in 1918 and in the springboard in 1919–20 and competed at the 1920 Summer Olympics. After the Olympics, he had a long career as a diving, swimming and water polo coach. He trained 17 Olympians including Frank Kurtz, Vicki Draves, Elizabeth Becker-Pinkston, Dorothy Poynton-Hill, Harold Smith, Buster Crabbe and Johnny Weissmuller.

Swendsen was born in Washington state, but lived most of his life in Los Angeles. He took up diving in 1914 and also played water polo, becoming a member of the national team in 1920. After that he coached for 14 years at the Los Angeles Athletic Club and the Hollywood Athletic Club and for five years each at University of California, Los Angeles and Hollywood High School. Between 1947 and 1950 he trained the national team of Guatemala. In 1980, he was inducted into the USA Water Polo Hall of Fame. In 1991 he was inducted into the International Swimming Hall of Fame.

See also
 List of members of the International Swimming Hall of Fame

References

External links

 

1895 births
1979 deaths
Olympic divers of the United States
Divers at the 1920 Summer Olympics
American male divers
American male water polo players
American diving coaches
American swimming coaches
American water polo coaches